Uttar Kattali Alhaz Mostafa Hakim University College EIIN: 104688 is a college which is situated at City Gate area, Chittagong. It was established in 1994. The college is run by the "Mostafa Hakim Welfare Foundation". The Foundation was established by Taher Group.

Department
HSC courses:
 Science
 Commerce
 Arts
 Degree (pass) courses:
 Department Of B. A. (pass)
 Department Of B. S. S. (pass)
 Department Of B. B. S. (pass)
 Honours courses:
 Department Of Philosophy
 Department Of Economics
 Department Of Accounting
 Department Of Management
Master's final courses:
 Department Of Accounting
 Department Of Management

Environment of the college and education 
There are science group, commerce group and arts group in this college for HSC level. On the other hand, there is degree level for higher studies. Recently, the college started Honours section. For this reason, construction of a building for honours is going on. The cost is 70 lakh taka and it is taken from college fund.

References 

Colleges in Chittagong
Universities and colleges in Chittagong District